Arthur Dea Elrod, Jr. (August 8, 1924 – February 18, 1974) was an American interior designer, perhaps best known for the Elrod House in Palm Springs, California designed by the architect John Lautner and built for Elrod in 1968.

Early life
Elrod was born in Anderson, South Carolina, grew up on a farm, and studied design at South Carolina's Clemson University, before attending the Chouinard Art Institute in Los Angeles.

Career
In 1954, Elrod and Harold "Hal" Broderick started Arthur Elrod and Associates, an interior design firm on Palm Canyon Drive in Palm Springs, and went on to hire William C. Raiser, Steve Chase, and others.

Personal life
In 1968, architect John Lautner built a home for Elrod in Palm Springs, California that became known as the Elrod House.

The parties he held at the Elrod House were "legendary", Bill Blass held a fashion show, Playboy did a November 1971 feature, Pleasure on the Rocks, and the house was used as Willard Whyte's mansion in the 1971 James Bond film, Diamonds Are Forever. The house has been described as the "ultimate bachelor pad", and it has been noted that increasing numbers of the "pads" in Playboy in the 1970s belonged to out gay men like Elrod.

Elrod was a close friend of Bob Hope and his wife Dolores.

Elrod and his associate, William Raiser, died in a traffic accident on February 18, 1974, when their Fiat sportscar was hit by a drunk teenage driver. Elrod was 49 years old.

References

"Arthur Elrod: Desert Modern Design" by Adele Cygelman (Gibbs Smith, 2019)

External links
 Civic Center: Arthur Elrod 1: 350 Via Lola
 Ron's Log: Elrod House

1924 births
1974 deaths
American interior designers
People from Atlanta
Gay men
Chouinard Art Institute alumni
Clemson University alumni
People from Palm Springs, California